Surat Thani Football Club is a Thailand football club, nicknamed The Roosters and based in Surat Thani Province located in the south of Thailand. The club is currently playing in the Thailand Amateur League Southern region.

History
The club was founded in 1998 From there, founded in 1999 participated in the Thailand Provincial League of Football League in parallel to the Thai League and headed by the Sports Authority of Thailand (SAT). In the founding year of the league in 1999, they reached the 9th place. Until the 2006 season, ran it for the team not much better. With a 7th-place finished the 2006 season could produce the best result so far.

In 2007, Surat Thani started their new season in Division 1 after the Provincial League was merged with Thailand premier League, Division 1, and Division 2. The biggest success of the club's history was certainly achieved in the quarterfinals of the Thai FA Cup in 2009 before the Roosters was 0–3 eliminated by TTM Samut Sakhon. However, the Roosters was relegated to the third-tier Regional League after finished the 14th place out of 16 teams in Division 1.

Stadium and locations

Season by season record

Honours
Regional League South Division
 Winner : 2016

Players

Current squad

References

External links
 Official Website

Football clubs in Thailand
Surat Thani province
Association football clubs established in 1998
1998 establishments in Thailand